The 3rd Battalion, Royal Anglian Regiment "The Steelbacks" is the Army Reserve unit of the Royal Anglian Regiment and is made up of volunteers who train in their spare time as soldiers. It was established on 1 April 2006, it was formed from five of the six companies of the East of England Regiment with A, B, C, E and HQ companies (all Royal Anglian cap badge) going to 3 Royal Anglian and D Company (Worcestershire and Sherwood Foresters cap badge) going to the 4th (V) Battalion, Mercian Regiment. In 2021, under the Future Soldier it was announced that the 19th Brigade would be reformed with its headquarters in York. The brigade will be tasked with home defence and home 'resilience' duties. The Brigade reformed on 23 July 2022) under command of 1st (United Kingdom) Division. Their Brigade Flash will no longer be the Desert Rat, it will be replaced with a Black Panther Head.

Organisation
The battalion headquarters is located in Bury St Edmunds just up the road from the Regimental headquarters at the keep. The company locations are as follows:

 1 (Norfolk & Suffolk) Company – Norwich and Lowestoft
 2 (Leicestershire & Northamptonshire) Company – Leicester and Corby 
 3 (Essex & Hertfordshire) Company – Chelmsford and Hitchin
 4 (Lincolnshire) Company - Lincoln and Grimsby 
 5 (Suffolk & Cambridgeshire) HQ Company – Bury St Edmunds

Roles
The battalion is primarily an infantry unit whose role is to provide formed units on operations and to provide individual replacements to their regular counterparts as and when they are needed. The battalion has a number of generalised departments which are based at each company location, these are:

 Adjudant General's Corps (Pay and admin)
 CIS, providing Communication, Information and Security
 Royal Army Medical Corps
 MT Platoon, providing motor transport
 Chefs, providing catering support
 Royal Electrical and Mechanical Engineers maintaining the battalions vehicles
 Rifle Platoon
 Stores

But also has a number of specialist/support platoons, these are:

 Military Intelligence Cell – Based at 5 company
 Psy Ops (Psychological Operations) – Based at 5 company
 Mortars – Based at A Company
 Anti-Tank – Based at B company
 Assault Pioneers – Based at C company
 Machine Guns – Based at E company

Experience

Although only a part-time unit and having only been established in 2006 the battalion has already accumulated a wealth of operational experience. Most members of the battalion have deployed at least once and many members have deployed multiple times. Here are some of the theatres the 3rd Battalion has served in:

 Afghanistan
 Bosnia
 Cyprus
 Iraq
 Kosovo
 Northern Ireland

Nickname
The 3rd battalion's nickname of "The Steelbacks" is taken from one of its former regiments, the 48th (Northamptonshire) Regiment of Foot who earned the nickname for their stoicism when being flogged with the cat-o'-nine tails ("Not a whimper under the lash"), a routine method of administering punishment in the Army in the 18th and early 19th centuries.

The future
The Steelbacks deployed for the first time as a battalion on operations when in 2011 they were tasked to fulfill the role as UN peacekeepers in Cyprus as part of Operation TOSCA.

The battalion will be heading to Spain later in 2022 to conduct Ex Iberian star alongside the Spanish Army.

References

External links
 1st Battalion Royal Anglian Regiment (The Vikings)
 2nd Battalion Royal Anglian Regiment (The Poachers)
 3rd Battalion Royal Anglian Regiment
 Royal Anglian Museum
 Grimsby Branch, The Royal Lincolnshire & Royal Anglian Regimental Association.

Royal Anglian Regiment 003
Military units and formations established in 2006
Royal Anglian Regiment